A number of vessels of the People's Liberation Army Navy have borne the name Xi'an, after the capital Xi'an.

 , a Type 051 destroyer, in service in 1972. Now preserved as a museum ship.
 , a Type 052C destroyer, in service since 2015.

References 

People's Liberation Army Navy ship names